Masamang Ugat is a 2003 Philippine action film co-written and directed by Willy Milan. The film stars Eddie Garcia, Ace Vergel, Victor Neri and Mikey Arroyo. This marks Ace Vergel's final theatrical appearance.

Cast
 Eddie Garcia as Apo Roman
 Ace Vergel as David
 Victor Neri as Darwin
 Mikey Arroyo as Angelo
 Maui Taylor as Lara
 Al Tantay as Ismael Valdez
 Levi Ignacio as Satur
 Susan Africa as Mercedes
 Gwen Garci as Gina
 Alicia Lane as Isabel
 Vanna Garcia as Liezel
 Eddie Arenas as Tata Simon
 Gamaliel Viray as Artemio
 Ama Quiambao as Alicia
 Bon Vibar as Col. Sanchez
 Kathy Mori as Cathy
 Manjo del Mundo as Ben Real
 Vic Belaro as De Castro

References

External links

2003 films
2003 action films
Filipino-language films
Philippine action films
Viva Films films
Films directed by Willy Milan